The Our Lady of Lourdes Church is located in the city of Tiruchirapalli in the state of Tamil Nadu, India. Built in the Gallo-Catholic design, the Church is devoted to Our Lady of Lourdes. The church is considered one of oldest of the 22 churches in the city which are older than 100 years. The church is located in the premises of St. Joseph's College Higher Secondary School, Trichy. The church is one of the major landmarks in the city. 

The foundation was laid during 1895 and the construction completed by 1903 when it was thrown open to public.
The images of St. Ignatius, St. Francis Xavier, Sacred Heart of Jesus, St. Peter, and St. John de Britto on the middle of the spire is the most notable feature of the church. The renovated church was dedicated on 10 February 1998 and the Way of cross was blessed and erected during 1999. The church presents a case study of a Gothic style church built fully with indigenous material and craftsmen.

Our Lady of Angels Church is a working church with hourly prayer and daily services and follows Roman Catholic sect of Christianity. The church has various religious practices from 5:15 am to 8 pm. There are four annual feasts in the church with the feast of Our Lady of Lourdes held annually on 11 February being the most prominent among them. The church is associated with the Roman Catholic Diocese of Tiruchirapalli, while it is maintained and administered by the Fathers of Society of Jesus (The Jesuits).

History

As per the official records of the church, Fr.Celle, S.J suggested Gothic style of architecture, while Fr.Louis Garnier, S.J. suggested Norman style of architecture. Tirunelveli born mason Savarimuthu was identified as the mason for the construction by the principal of St. Joseph college Joseph Pei (1884–93). During January 1890, the Bishop of  Tiruchirappalli, Rt.Rev.Alexis Canoz SJ, laid the foundation stone. Mr. Savarimuthu, the mason carried out the construction of the church.  Savarimuthu is believed to have taken two years to identify patterns and Christian symbolism. The construction completed by 1903 when it was thrown open to public. On account of his services, he was buried under the crypt of the altar, which is otherwise reserved only for revered priests of the church. As a part of the Jubilee celebration, the renovated church was dedicated on 10 February 1998. The Way of cross was blessed and erected during 1999. The church is associated with the Roman Catholic Diocese of Tiruchirapalli, while it is maintained and administered by the Fathers of Society of Jesus (The Jesuits).

Architecture

Our Lady of Lourdes Church is located opposite to Main Guard gate in Trichy, a major City in the South Indian state of Tamil Nadu. The church is located in the premises of St. Joseph's College Higher Secondary School, Trichy. The church is decked out in Gallo-Catholic design, from neo-Gothic spires to anguished scenes of crucifixion and martyrdom painted inside. In a note of cross-religious pollination, icons of Virgin Mary are garlanded in flower necklaces. Constructed in the year 1881 AD, the church is situated near the Rock Fort. There are around 120 turrets in the building. The statues of the Sacred Heart of Jesus, St. Ignatius of Loyola, St. Francis Xavier and St. John de Britto are placed at the center of the tower. The church is painted in white and maroon. The glass windows are painted with different chapters in the life of Jesus. The altar of the church is made of sandalwood. As per the research paper of the National Institute of Technology Tiruchirapalli (NITT), the church presents a case study of a Gothic style church built fully with indigenous material and craftsmen. The place where it is located was part of the moat surrounding the Fort of Tiruchirappalli.

Religious practices
The feast of Our Lady of Lourdes is held annually on 11 February. Mass is held at various timings during 5:30 am, 6:30 am, 8 am, 5 pm (English) and 6 pm during week days. During Sunday, mass is held at 5:15 am, 6:15 am, 7:30 am and 6:30 pm. Charismatic prayer service is held during Thursdays at 5:30 pm, Special Novena for the Sacred Heart during Fridays at 6:00 pm and Special mass of Lady of Lourdes at 6:00 pm during Saturdays. During Sundays, Evangelist prayer for the power of the holy spirit from 10:00 am to 1:00 pm and exposition of  the various books of The Bible at 6 pm. There are four feast held annually in the church. The feast of Our Lady of Lourdes is held on 11 February, the feast of St. Joseph on 19 March, the feast of St. Ignatius on 31 July and the feast of St. Francis Xavier on 3 December. December is considered the Advent season during which Carol services and Special Mass is held in the church

References

External links

Roman Catholic churches in Tamil Nadu
Roman Catholic churches completed in 1840
19th-century Roman Catholic church buildings in India
Churches in Tiruchirappalli